Ryan Huddy (born August 28, 1983) is a Canadian former professional ice hockey center who played in the American Hockey League with the Springfield Falcons and the San Antonio Rampage.  Huddy played for a single game for the Rampage in the 2010–11 season, while on loan from the Las Vegas Wranglers in the ECHL. He concluded his career after the 2011–12 season in Italy with HC Valpellice of the Serie A due to injury.

References

External links

1983 births
Bemidji State Beavers men's ice hockey players
Canadian ice hockey centres
Hannover Indians players
Las Vegas Wranglers players
Living people
Odense Bulldogs players
San Antonio Rampage players
Springfield Falcons players
Stockton Thunder players
HC Valpellice players
Canadian expatriate ice hockey players in Denmark
Canadian expatriate ice hockey players in Italy
Canadian expatriate ice hockey players in Germany